The Silver State Legacy is a team of the Women's Football Alliance that began play in 2011.  Based in North Las Vegas, Nevada, United States, the Legacy plays its home games at Legacy High School.

The Legacy is one of two WFA teams in Las Vegas, the other being the Las Vegas Showgirlz.

Season-by-season

|-
|2011 || 6 || 2 || 0 || 1st American Southwest || Lost American Conference Quarterfinal (San Diego)
|-
|2012* || 2 || 2 || 0 || 3rd WFA American 17 || --
|-
!Totals || 8 || 4 || 0
|colspan="2"|(including playoffs)

* = current standing

2011 Roster

2011

Standings

Season Schedule

** = Won by forfeit

2012

Season schedule

External links 
 

American football teams in the Las Vegas Valley
Women's Football Alliance teams
American football teams established in 2011
American football teams disestablished in 2017
2011 establishments in Nevada
2017 disestablishments in Nevada
Women in Nevada